The 1938 Tipperary Senior Hurling Championship was the 48th staging of the Tipperary Senior Hurling Championship since its establishment by the Tipperary County Board in 1887.

Moycarkey-Borris were the defending champions.

Thurles Sarsfields won the championship after a 7-07 to 2-02 defeat of Kildangan in the final. It was their 11th championship title overall and their first title since 1936.

References

Tipperary
Tipperary Senior Hurling Championship